River Cong may refer to:
River Cong (Ireland), a river in County Galway, Ireland
River Cong (Norfolk), a river in Norfolk, England, UK